Borges International Group is a Spanish food company based in Tàrrega, Catalonia. It was founded in 1896.

Borges produces a range of olive oil. The company exports products to over 120 countries and offers private-label production services. The company's headquarters are located in Reus and Tàrrega (100 km from Barcelona), with 1100 employees, turnover of 670 million euros.

History 
In 1896, the couple Antonio Pont Pont and Dolores Creus Casanovas founded Industrias Pont in Tárrega (Lérida) for the sale of almonds and olives, typical products of the region.

In 1914, the industrialization of the group began with the acquisition of an oil mill to obtain olive oil.

In 1985, the first international subsidiary was created in California for the supply of walnuts and almonds.

International presence 
The company has an important international activity, not in vain approximately 75% of the group's sales are made abroad. The company is one of the world leaders in the olive oil, vinegar, walnut, olive and almond markets.

The company belongs to the Leading Brands of Spain Forum.

References

External links 
Company website

Food and drink companies of Spain
Companies based in Catalonia
Food and drink companies established in 1896
Spanish brands
Olive oil
1896 establishments in Spain
Companies established in 1896